Pandaravadai Perumandi is a village in the Kumbakonam taluk in Thanjavur district in the Indian state of Tamil Nadu.

Demographics
 India census, Perumandi had a population of 7000. Males constitute 51% of the population and females 49%. Perumandi has an average literacy rate of 83%, higher than the national average of 59.5%: male literacy is 88%, and female literacy is 79%. In Perumandi, 8% of the population is under 6 years of age.

References

Villages in Thanjavur district